The position of Under-Secretary of State for Dominion Affairs was a British ministerial position, subordinate to that of Secretary of State for Dominion Affairs, created in 1925 to deal with British relations with the Dominions – Canada, Australia, New Zealand, South Africa, Newfoundland, and the Irish Free State. 

In 1947 the office was replaced by the Under-Secretary of State for Commonwealth Relations.

Under-Secretaries of State for Dominion Affairs, 1925-47

1925: Earl of Clarendon
1927: Lord Lovat
1929: Earl of Plymouth
1929: Arthur Ponsonby
1929: William Lunn
1931: Malcolm MacDonald
1935: Lord Stanley
1935: Douglas Hacking
1936: Marquess of Hartington
1940: Geoffrey Shakespeare
1942: Paul Emrys-Evans
1945: John Parker
1946: Arthur Bottomley

Permanent Under-Secretaries of State for Dominion Affairs, 1925-47
The post lasted as long as the office itself, from 1925 to 1947 with the last Permanent Under-Secretary of State for Dominion Affairs, Sir Eric Machtig, transferring in 1947 to become the Permanent Under-Secretary of State for Commonwealth Relations, jointly with A. Carter formerly of the India Office.

Lists of government ministers of the United Kingdom
Defunct ministerial offices in the United Kingdom
1925 establishments in the United Kingdom
1947 disestablishments in the United Kingdom

Foreign Office during World War II